Arang and the Magistrate (also known as Tale of A-rang) is a 2012 South Korean historical television drama (sageuk), starring Lee Joon-gi, Shin Min-ah, and Yeon Woo-jin. The period horror-romance is based on the folklore of Arang, who died unjustly and returns as a ghost in order to reveal the circumstances surrounding her death. It aired on MBC from August 15 to October 18, 2012 on Wednesdays and Thursdays at 21:55 (KST) for 20 episodes.

Synopsis
A nobleman named Kim Eun-oh (Lee Joon-gi) comes to town searching for his mother after hearing a rumor that she is staying at the village of Miryang. He has the special ability to hear, see and touch spirits, but pretends he doesn't because he gets annoyed when they pester him to help them.

Arang (Shin Min-ah) lost all her memories when she became a ghost and is unable to rest in peace until she finds out how she died. After appearing to three magistrates, none of them survive the fright of seeing her. Some local officials, desperate over the fact that no one wanted to take up the position for so long, coerce Eun-oh into becoming the new magistrate. When she finds out that Eun-oh is able to see her, and has been appointed as the new magistrate, she begs for his help.

At first, Eun-oh rejects her request. However, he changes his mind after seeing that Arang somehow has a distinctive hairpin that he gave his mother at their last meeting. He believes that if he helps her, Arang will regain her memories and give him information about his mother. He exasperatedly (then affectionately) nicknames her "Amnesia". As the town's newly installed magistrate, he teams up with her to investigate the circumstances surrounding her death, which may involve the mysterious nobleman Joo-wal. Along the way, they must prevent Arang from being captured by Mu-young (Han Jung-soo), the leader of the local grim reapers. Eun-oh also uncovers a long history of corruption by a local nobleman and decides to use his new position as magistrate to bring justice and order.

Arang and Eun-oh's actions, meanwhile, are being tracked by the Jade Emperor and Yeom-ra themselves, who fear that events in Miryang are much more horrifying than they appear.

Cast

Main
 Lee Joon-gi as Kim Eun-oh
 Shin Min-a as Arang / Lee Seo-rim
Yeon Woo-jin as Joo-wal
 Hwang Bo-ra as Bang-wool, shaman
 Kwon Oh-joong as Dol-soe, Eun-oh's manservant
 Han Jung-soo as Mu-young, head ghost reaper
 Kang Moon-young as Lady Seo, Eun-oh's mother
 Kim Yong-gun as Lord Choi

Supporting
 Yoo Seung-ho as Jade Emperor, King of Heaven
 Park Jun-gyu as Yama, King of the Underworld
 Kim Kwang-kyu as Lee Bang
 Lee Sang-hoon as Hyung Bang
 Min Sung-wook as Ye Bang
 Kim Min-jae as Geo Deol
 Song Jae-ryong as Kim Seo-bang
 Noh Hee-ji as heavenly fairy
 Lee Yong-yi as Lee Seo-rim's housekeeper
 Lim Ju-eun as Mu-yeon
 Yoon Joo-sang as Lord Kim, Eun-oh's father
 Yoon Do-hyun as former magistrate of Miryang (cameo, ep. 1)
 Jung Soo-young as Bang-wool's client (cameo, ep. 1)
 Im Hyun-sik as ghost (cameo, ep. 2)
 Jeong Bo-seok as teacher (cameo, ep. 14)
 Lee Sung-min as gatekeeper (cameo, ep. 20)
 Song Won-seok as Seok a Chugi (Angels of Death)

Background
The drama is based on famous folklore, as most ghost stories are: During the Joseon era in the city of Miryang, Arang was the pure, beautiful, goodhearted daughter of a magistrate. She grew up without a mother and was raised by a wicked caretaker who conspired to have her raped and ruined by a servant, Baekga. He attacked and she resisted, so he stabbed and killed her, and left her body to rot in the woods. Her father, the magistrate, just believed that she dishonorably eloped with a man and so resigned his position swathed in shame. Thus the legend goes that every time a new magistrate comes to Miryang to fill the position, Arang's vengeful ghost shows up to tell him her story and he flees in terror. But one day a new magistrate comes to town — a young man by the name of Lee Sang-sa. Arang appears to him like every other magistrate before him, but this man doesn't flee, and instead sympathizes with Arang, and promises to find her killer and avenge her death. Lee Sang-sa has Baekga seized and executed, and thereafter, Arang's spirit ceased to trouble the town.

Production
It was Lee Joon-gi's comeback acting project after being discharged from military service in February 2012. This also marked the first historical drama for Shin Min-ah and return to television since My Girlfriend Is a Nine-Tailed Fox in 2010.

The series was filmed at MBC Dramia in Gyeonggi Province. The first behind-the-scene photos were released on show of June 22, 2012, filming scenes shot on location in Namyangju on May 23. This was followed by more teaser photos released on July 11, 2012, showing action scenes and an intimate scene of the two leads, Lee and Shin laying down together.

Ahead of the series' premiere, MBC aired the special episode How to Enjoy Arang and the Magistrate 100 Times More on August 8, 2012. It included never-before-seen clips, special behind-the-scenes stories, and detailed the characters and their relationships. It was the first drama special produced by MBC in five years since The Legend in 2007.

Original soundtrack

Ratings
 In the table below, the  represent the lowest ratings and the  represent the highest ratings.
 According to AGB Nielsen Media Research, the premiere episode achieved a nationwide rating of 13.3 percent in viewership, almost doubled rival To the Beautiful You on SBS with 7.4 percent for its premiere episode but behind Bridal Mask on KBS with 19.4 percent. It was also 4.2 percent higher than the last episode of its predecessor I Do, I Do.

Awards and nominations

International broadcast
 It aired in the Philippines on GMA Network from January 20 to March 14, 2014 under the title Tale of Arang: A Love Without End. Re-aired this 2019 on GMA News TV, coming soon.
 It aired in Japan on cable channel DATV.
 It aired in Vietnam on VTC9 - Let's Viet channel beginning June 18, 2014 under the title Arang sử đạo truyện.
 It aired in Thailand on Workpoint TV beginning January 5, 2015 under the title อารัง ภูติสาวรักนิรันดร์ (Arang Phuth Saw Rak Niran, literally; Arang: ghost girl love eternal).
 It aired in Malaysia on cable channel NTV7.

References

External links
 Arang and the Magistrate official MBC website 
 Tale of Arang at MBC Global Media
 
 

MBC TV television dramas
South Korean historical television series
2012 South Korean television series debuts
2012 South Korean television series endings
Television series set in the Joseon dynasty
Korean-language television shows
South Korean fantasy television series
Ghosts in television